Jani Nikanor Sievinen (born 31 March 1974) is a former medley swimmer from Finland, who won the silver medal in the 200 m individual medley at the 1996 Summer Olympics in Atlanta, Georgia. In winning the World Championship 200m individual medley title in 1994, he established a new world record of 1:58.16 which lasted for almost nine years until it was broken by Michael Phelps (USA).

Jani Sievinen was married to Mari Sievinen. They have three daughters (born 2008, 2010 and 2013). Sievinen also has two sons (born 1997 and 2001) from his previous marriage to Susanna Sievinen.

References
 Personal website: www.janisievinen.com 
 

1974 births
Living people
People from Vihti
Olympic swimmers of Finland
Finnish male freestyle swimmers
Finnish male backstroke swimmers
Finnish male medley swimmers
Olympic silver medalists for Finland
Swimmers at the 1992 Summer Olympics
Swimmers at the 1996 Summer Olympics
Swimmers at the 2000 Summer Olympics
Swimmers at the 2004 Summer Olympics
World record setters in swimming
World Aquatics Championships medalists in swimming
Medalists at the FINA World Swimming Championships (25 m)
European Aquatics Championships medalists in swimming
Medalists at the 1996 Summer Olympics
Olympic silver medalists in swimming
Sportspeople from Uusimaa